Gary O'Shaughnessy is an Irish singer and musician who represented Ireland in Eurovision Song Contest 2001 with the song "Without Your Love" finishing 21st out of 23 entries.
He's the uncle of Ryan O'Shaughnessy who represented Ireland at the Eurovision Song Contest 2018.

Biography
He comes from a very musical family. His grandmother who was a gifted piano and fiddle player. Besides singing, he plays guitar, bass guitar and keyboards. His brother Brian and sister are musicians as well, with his brother playing guitar and his sister the piano. O'Shaughnessy started studying at age of 12 for four years with Irish jazz guitarist Eugene Macari. In 1989, he formed a band with his brother Brian and together they toured Ireland, Spain and the UK. In 1995, the two brothers performed as the duo "2 of a kind" which became very popular in cabarets, clubs and pubs.

Gary O'Shaughnessy had competed in the local Irish Eurovision Song Contest preselection twice previously, before winning the right to represent his homeland in the Eurovision Contest in 2001 in Copenhagen, Denmark with "Without Your Love" written by Pat Sheridan. He had previously entered the Irish Eurosong 1997 contest, coming third with "Love and Understanding". Also, in 1999, he had taken part with the song "I'll Be There" coming fifth.

Discography

Singles
1997: "Love and Understanding"
1999: "I'll Be There"
2001: "Without Your Love"

References

Living people
Irish male singers
Eurovision Song Contest entrants for Ireland
Eurovision Song Contest entrants of 2001
Year of birth missing (living people)